Robert H. Cumming (1943 – December 16, 2021) was an American painter, sculptor, photographer, and printmaker best known for his photographs of conceptual drawings and constructions, which layer meanings within meanings, and reference both science and art history.

Early life
Cumming earned a BFA in 1965 from Massachusetts College of Art in Boston and an MFA in 1967 at the University of Illinois at Urbana-Champaign.

Career
His first teaching position was at the University of Wisconsin–Milwaukee, where he was involved with mail art, an early conceptual art movement that conferred art status on items sent through the postal system.  In 1970, Cumming moved to southern California to lecture on photography, and in 1974, he started teaching at the University of California, Los Angeles. In 1978, Cumming moved back to New England, where he continued to teach and make art.

Institutional representation
Cumming is represented in the permanent collections of various major art museums, including the Museum of Modern Art, New York; the Baltimore Museum of Art; the Art Institute of Chicago; the Dallas Museum of Art; the Museum of Fine Arts, Houston; the Denver Art Museum; the George Eastman Museum; the Minneapolis Institute of Arts; the Whitney Museum of American Art, New York; the Walker Art Center, Minneapolis; the San Francisco Museum of Modern Art, the J. Paul Getty Museum, Los Angeles, and Honolulu Museum of Art Spalding House (formerly The Contemporary Museum, Honolulu).

Personal life and death
Cumming died on December 16, 2021, at the age of 78.

References

Sources
 Baltimore Museum of Art, 14 American photographers: Walker Evans, Robert Adams, Lewis Baltz, Paul Caponigro, William Christenberry, Linda Connor, Cosmos, Robert Cumming, William Eggleston, Lee Friedlander, John R. Gossage, Gary Hallman, Tod Papageorge, Garry Winogrand, Baltimore, Baltimore Museum of Art, 1975.
 MIT List Visual Arts Center, Three on technology: New Photographs by Robert Cumming, Lee Friedlander, Jan Groover, Cambridge, Mass., MIT List Visual Arts Center, 1988.
 Turnbull, Betty, Rooms, Roments Remembered, Robert Cumming, Michael Davis, Roland Reiss, Richard Turner, Bruce Williams, Newport Beach, Calif., Newport Harbor Art Museum, 1978.
 Yager, David, Frames of reference, photographic paths: Zeke Berman, George Blakeley, Eileen Cowin, John Craig, Robert Cumming, Darryl Curran, Fred Endsley, William Larson, Bart Parker, Victor Schrager, the Starn twins, Baltimore, Visual Arts Dept., University of Maryland, Baltimore County, 1989.

1943 births
2021 deaths
Massachusetts College of Art and Design alumni
University of Illinois Urbana-Champaign alumni
20th-century American painters
American male painters
21st-century American painters
American photographers
University of Wisconsin–Milwaukee faculty
Artists from Worcester, Massachusetts
UCLA School of the Arts and Architecture faculty
20th-century American sculptors
American male sculptors
20th-century American printmakers
Sculptors from Massachusetts
Nut artists
20th-century American male artists